Jean-Louis Tourenne (born 1944 in La Mézière) is a French politician and the former President of the general council of Ille-et-Vilaine. He is a member of the Socialist Party.

He became the first PS President of the general council of Ille-et-Vilaine since 1848 following the 2004 French cantonal elections, when the left gained the department from the right.  He was reelected in 2011.

References

1944 births
Living people
Socialist Party (France) politicians
Senators of Ille-et-Vilaine
Politicians from Brittany
People from Ille-et-Vilaine
French Senators of the Fifth Republic